Seven Year Ache is the third studio album by American country music singer Rosanne Cash, and her second for Columbia Records. It was released on February 28, 1981, and reached number one on the Billboard country album chart. Three singles were released from her album; in the order of the singles' release they were: the title track, My Baby Thinks He's a Train, and Blue Moon with Heartache. Prior to that album's release, Cash hit the talk show circuit, starting with her appearance on The Merv Griffin Show.

Track listing

Personnel
Rosanne Cash - vocals
Tony Brown - electric piano
Rodney Crowell - guitar, harmony vocals
Vince Gill - harmony vocals
Emmylou Harris - harmony vocals
Booker T. Jones - organ, synthesizer 
Albert Lee - acoustic and electric guitar
Mickey Raphael - harmonica
Ricky Skaggs - harmony vocals
Rosemary Butler - harmony vocals
Hank DeVito - electric and steel guitar
Janis Gill - harmony vocals
Emory Gordy Jr. - guitar, mandolin, bass, piano, string arrangements
Glen Hardin - piano
Phil Kenzie - saxophone
Maxayn Lewis - harmony vocals
Larrie Londin - drums
Jerry McGee - electric guitar
Milah's Bros. - handclapping
Frank Reckard - electric guitar
Technical
Arlene Katz, Emory Gordy, Jr., Hank DeVito - production assistance
Donivan Cowart, Bradley Hartman - engineers

Charts

Weekly charts

Year-end charts

References

1981 albums
Rosanne Cash albums
Columbia Records albums
Albums produced by Rodney Crowell